Sally Speare Lutyens (October 31, 1927 – July 22, 2005) was a composer, author, and librettist from Falmouth, Maine. She also resided in Portland and Manset, Maine, Weston, MA and Reading, PA.

Her works include First Light: An Oratorio (as composer and librettist), A Pocket Full of Wry (as author), Auguste (as composer and librettist), and The Light Princess (as composer and librettist). She studied piano with Claude Frank and taught music and piano at the Cambridge School of Weston, Weston, MA from 1967 to 1974.

References

American women composers
American librettists
2005 deaths
1927 births
People from Falmouth, Maine
Women librettists
20th-century American women writers
20th-century American women musicians
20th-century American composers
20th-century women composers
21st-century American women